Mike Dennery is a former professional American football player who played linebacker for three seasons for the Oakland Raiders and Miami Dolphins.

References

1950 births
American football linebackers
Oakland Raiders players
Miami Dolphins players
Southern Miss Golden Eagles football players
Living people